= Eye color 1 (green/blue) =

Genetic element in the species Homo sapiens

EYCL1

Identifiers
- Aliases: EYCL1, GEY, eye color 1 (green/blue)
- External IDs: GeneCards: EYCL1; OMA:EYCL1 - orthologs
Orthologs
Species	Human	Mouse
Entrez	2141	n/a
Ensembl	n/a	n/a
UniProt	n a	n/a
RefSeq (mRNA)	n/a	n/a
RefSeq (protein)	n/a	n/a
Location (UCSC)	n/a	n/a
PubMed search		n/a
- Wikidata
View/Edit Human

Eye color 1 (green/blue) or EYCL1 is a gene or a set of genes in humans located on chromosome 19. Its previous gene name was GEY. It is phenotype only.
